Brucoli is a southern Italian hamlet (frazione) of Augusta, a municipality part of the Province of Syracuse, Sicily.

It has a population of 1,098.

At the ancient time, it was a colony of Megara founded by the Megarian Lamis and called Trotilon.

Gallery

References

External links
 

Frazioni of the Province of Syracuse
Ancient cities in Sicily
Megarian colonies
Colonies of Magna Graecia